Craig Chambers has been a computer scientist at Google since 2007. Prior to this, he was a Professor in the department of Computer Science and Engineering at the University of Washington. He received his B.S. degree in Computer Science from MIT in 1986 and his Ph.D. in Computer Science from Stanford in 1992. He is best known for the influential research language Self, which introduced prototypes as an alternative to classes, and code-splitting, a compilation technique that generates separate code paths for fast and general cases to speed execution of dynamically typed programs.

References

Living people
Programming language designers
Programming language researchers
Year of birth missing (living people)
University of Washington faculty
MIT School of Engineering alumni
Stanford University alumni